Zgosht is a village in the Elbasan County, eastern Albania. Following the local governmental reform of 2015, Zgosht became a part of the municipality of Librazhd and is under the municipal unit of Lunik.

Demographic History
Zgosht (Izgosht) is attested in the Ottoman defter of 1467 as a village in the vilayet of Çermeniça. It had a total of seven households represented by the following household heads: Progon Kalluri, Martin Kalluri, Mihal Ribari, Pop Nikolla, Bratislav son of Dimitri, Andrija Radi, and Petër Pikaj (possibly, Pekaj, Pjekaj).

References

Villages in Elbasan County
Populated places in Librazhd